Rui Manuel dos Santos Caçador (born 29 October 1953) is a Portuguese football manager. He is without a club.

Rui Caçador has had many managed many clubs and national teams. He has had several roles in the national team, which include the Portuguese under-20 team — managing them on three occasions — the Portuguese under-21 team — managing them once — and assistant manager of Portuguese senior team, in which he served on three occasions.

Caçador has also managed Maxaquene, Benfica's under-19, Costa do Sol, and the Mozambican national team. As the Portuguese under-20 team manager, he discovered the talents of many Portuguese football legends, which include Rui Costa, João Pinto, Capucho, and Luís Figo.

Honours
Moçambola — 1985
Mozambican Cup — 1988

External links
 Treinador Nacional - Rui Manuel dos Santos Caçador (29.10.1953 ) at Portuguese Football Federation

1953 births
Living people
People from Viseu
Portuguese football managers
Mozambique national football team managers
Expatriate football managers in Mozambique
1996 African Cup of Nations managers
Sportspeople from Viseu District